is a Japanese koryū martial art whose foundation dates back to the early 16th century. The art developed some notoriety in Japan during the early 20th century under Kunii Zen'ya (1894-1966), the 18th generation sōke (headmaster). The current sōke is the 21st generation, Kunii Masakatsu. While the line is still headed by the Kunii family, the title of sōke is now largely honorific, and the responsibility for the preservation and transmission of the ryūha now lies in the shihanke line, currently represented by the 19th generation, Seki Humitake.

History
The characters Kashima 鹿島 are in honor of the deity enshrined in the Kashima Shrine located in Kashima, Ibaraki Prefecture, who is supposed to have provided the divine inspiration (shin 神) for Kashima Shin-ryū.   The earliest elements of the school are credited to Kashima no Tachi, fencing techniques passed down by the priests of the Kashima Shrine following their creation by Kuninazu no Mahito in the 7th century.  In Kashima Shinryū lore, Matsumoto Bizen-no-kami, assisted by Kunii Kagetsugu, refined and expounded on Kashima no Tachi into the basis of the modern school.  After this development, they went their separate ways.  Kunii Kagetsugu began what is now named the sōke lineage (and is credited as the 1st generation of such), based in Iwaki province and handed down through the Kunii family line.  Conversely, Matsumoto Bizen-no-kami taught a large number of students, creating a number of martial lineages, often with characters reading shinkage in the name.  In 1780, the 12th generation sōke, Kunii Taizen Minamoto no Ritsuzan attained mastery in Jikishinkage-ryū, studying under Ono Seiemon Taira no Shigemasa.  As Jikishinkage-ryū also traced its founding back to Matsumoto Bizen-no-kami, but passed down through Kamiizumi Ise-no-kami Fujiwara-no-Nobutsuna rather than the Kunii family, this lineage is recognized within Kashima Shinryū as the shihanke line, crediting Matsumoto Bizen-no-kami as the 1st generation.  The sōke and shihanke lines remained united within the Kunii family until Kunii Zen'ya appointed Seki Humitake as his successor and the 19th generation shihanke while leaving his wife, Kunii Shizu, to carry on as the 19th generation sōke.

Despite the similarity of names, Kashima Shinryū is of only passing relation to Kashima Shintō-ryū.  While both schools regard Kashima no Tachi as a major antecedent, Kashima Shintō-ryū claims as founder Tsukahara Bokuden, who independently generated a different refinement on Kashima no Tachi than that of Matsumoto Bizen-no-Kami.

Ranks 

The following licenses exist under the Kashima-Shinryū Federation of Martial Sciences:

Locations 
Kashima Shin-ryū can be studied in Japan (including Tokyo, Kyoto, and Tsukuba), and also in the United States (including Los Angeles, Athens, and Bozeman) and in Europe (including Breda, Dresden, Frankfurt, Helsinki, Ljubljana, Geneva, London, and Tampere).

References

External links
 Kashima-Shinryū Federation of Martial Sciences website

15th-century establishments in Japan
Ko-ryū bujutsu
Japanese martial arts
Japanese swordsmanship